Uppugudem is a village in Eluru district of the Indian state of Andhra Pradesh. It is administered under of Eluru revenue division.

Demographics 

 Census of India, Uppugudem has population of 121 of which 51 are males while 51 are females. Average Sex Ratio is 1373. Population of children with age 0-6 is 11 which makes up 9.09% of total population of village, Child sex ratio is 120. Literacy rate of the village was 50.91%.

References

Villages in Eluru district